Jordan Hunter is the name of:

Jordan Hunter (basketball, born 1990), New Zealand women's basketball player
Jordan Hunter (basketball, born 1997), Australian men's basketball player
Jordan Hunter (footballer) (born 1999), English footballer